Pennant Point is a rural community located at the head of Pennant Harbour near Sambro on the Chebucto Peninsula in the Halifax Regional Municipality Nova Scotia on Route 349.

Pennant Point is part of the Crystal Crescent Beach Provincial Park, which is popular with hikers and beachgoers.

Communications
Telephone exchange 902 - 868 
 First three digits of postal code - B3V

Submarine Cables

Pennant Point is a junction for Submarine communications cables from the United States, Europe, and Newfoundland.  It connects with Herring Cove, Nova Scotia, about 12 km linear or about 20 km road distance away.  Some connections north from Pennant Point are actually made through Herring Cove.

List of Cables

TAT-9 - Manahawkin New Jersey, Conil, Cadiz, Spain, Goonhilly Downs, England, St. Hilaire-de-Riez, France - 8,358 Kilometers
CANTAT-3 - Vestmannaeyjar, Iceland -- Tjørnuvík, Faroe Islands -- Redcar, United Kingdom -- Blaabjerg, Denmark—7,104 Kilometers
CANUS 1 -Manasquan, New Jersey—1360 Kilometers
CANTAT-2 -Retired -Widemouth, England - 5,195 Kilometers

Satellite station
A small satellite station operates the Inmarsat system from Pennant Point.

Parks
Crystal Crescent Beach Provincial Park

Communities in Halifax, Nova Scotia
General Service Areas in Nova Scotia